Mõega is a village on the Estonian island Muhu. It is located in the eastern part of the island by the main road in Muhu (segment of the Risti–Kuressaare road, nr 10, the "Saaremaa road"), just between Kuivastu (the main port in Muhu) and Liiva (the administrative centre of the municipality). Administratively Mõega belongs to Muhu Parish in Saare County.

Mõega is home to Tammisaare Farm Museum.

Mõega Leedumägi was an important burial site in ancient Muhu, it was destroyed during a road construction in the Soviet times.

References

Villages in Saare County